Groot  is a fictional character from comic books by Marvel Comics. 
Groot may also refer to:

Groot (Marvel Cinematic Universe), film adaptation
Groot (surname), Dutch surname
Hohgrat mountain

See also
De Groot